This is an index of breakfast-related articles. Breakfast is the first meal taken after rising from a night's sleep, most often eaten in the early morning before undertaking the day's work. Among English speakers, "breakfast" can be used to refer to this meal, or to a meal composed of traditional breakfast foods (such as eggs, oatmeal and sausage) served at any time of day.

B

 Bed and breakfast
 Beer soup
 Breakfast
 Breakfast cereal
 Breakfast roll
 Breakfast sausage
 Breakfast tea
 English breakfast tea
 Irish breakfast tea
 Brunch

C

 Champagne breakfast

D
 Dim sum

E
 Elevenses

F

 Free Breakfast for Children
 Frühschoppen
 Full breakfast

G
 General Mills monster-themed breakfast cereals

H
 History of breakfast

I
 Instant breakfast
 Israeli breakfast

L

 List of breakfast beverages
 List of breakfast cereal advertising characters
 List of breakfast cereals
 List of breakfast foods

M
 Midnight breakfast

N
 North Melbourne Grand Final Breakfast
 NRL Grand Final Breakfast

P
 Pancake house
 List of pancake houses

S
 School breakfast club
 Second breakfast
 Suhoor

W
 Wedding breakfast

Y
 Yum cha

See also
 Breakfast television
 List of breakfast beverages
 List of breakfast foods
 List of brunch foods

References

 List of breakfast topics
Breakfast
Wikipedia indexes